Lawrence Allen (1921–2018) was a racewalker.

Lawrence Allen/Allan may also refer to:

Lawrence Allan from National Festival of Community Theatre
Lawrence Allen (educator) from Hiram Clarke, Houston

See also
Laurence Allen (disambiguation)
Larry Allen (disambiguation)
Laurie Allen (disambiguation)